Nicosia Municipal Theater is a prominent theatrical organization in Northern Cyprus. Headquartered in North Nicosia, it is organized under the Nicosia Turkish Municipality.

It was founded in 1980. The establishment was prompted by the firing of a leading group of actors, including Yaşar Ersoy and Osman Alkaş, following a politically sensitive play that was staged in the wake of the 1980 Turkish coup d'état in the first culture and arts festival in North Nicosia. Despite the limited budget of the municipality, Mustafa Akıncı, the mayor at the time, put effort to provide for the theater. Despite its starts in harsh conditions and unkempt buildings, the theater grew to become an influential part of the Turkish Cypriot society. It has been praised for its performances that do not abstain from expressing political views and uphold the freedom of speech. In 2012, the temporary administration of the municipality proposed the closure of the theater due to financial problems, but the proposal met with fierce criticism and opposition, resulting in its withdrawal. Outside Northern Cyprus, the theater has performed in various cities across Turkey and in the Republic of Cyprus.

It organizes the annual Cyprus Theater Festival. The theater is currently active in its own building, however, the building has been deemed insufficient and the festival mainly takes place in the Near East University. A project to build a new theatrical center with a capacity of more than 3500 has been underway since 1996. The construction of the building has been partially completed but the project has stalled due to financial limitations, despite the vows of successive mayors to finish the project.

See also 

 Nicosia Municipal Orchestra

References 

Theatres in Nicosia
Culture in Nicosia
Organisations based in Northern Cyprus
Buildings and structures in North Nicosia